Charles Edward Kniffin (born October 28, 1950) is an American former professional baseball player and coach. Much of Kniffin's three-decade professional career was spent in minor league baseball, but he served 2½ seasons as the Major League pitching coach of the –04 Arizona Diamondbacks on the staff of then-manager Bob Brenly.

Kniffin was born in Rockville Centre, New York. A ,  left-handed pitcher during his playing days, he was selected by the Philadelphia Phillies in the 25th round of the 1969 Major League Baseball draft out of Nassau Community College. He pitched for ten seasons in the Phillie farm system, compiling a 55–40 record in 244 appearances. He then was out of baseball from 1979–87 before becoming a pitching coach at the minor league level in the Seattle Mariners' organization.

He worked on Brenly's staff until July 3, 2004, when both he and Brenly were fired in the midst of the rebuilding D-Back's disastrous 51–111 season. Kniffin then served as pitching coach of the Triple-A Colorado Springs Sky Sox from 2006–09 until his retirement at the close of the 2009 minor league season.

References

External links

1950 births
Living people
Arizona Diamondbacks coaches
Baseball players from New York (state)
Major League Baseball pitching coaches
Nassau Community College alumni
Oklahoma City 89ers players
People from Rockville Centre, New York
People from Teller County, Colorado
Pulaski Phillies players
Reading Phillies players
Spartanburg Phillies players
Sportspeople from Colorado Springs, Colorado
Toledo Mud Hens players